Calathus carinatus is a species of ground beetle from the Platyninae subfamily that is endemic to the Canary Islands.

References

carinatus
Beetles described in 1839
Endemic beetles of the Canary Islands
Taxa named by Gaspard Auguste Brullé